George Aubrey Zentmyer, Jr. (August 9, 1913 – February 8, 2003) was an American plant physiologist and professor emeritus at University of California, Riverside. He was known as one of the world's foremost authorities on Phytophthora.

Early life
Zentmyer was born in North Platte, Nebraska to Mary Elizabeth Strahorn and George Aubrey Zentmyer, Sr.
While an undergraduate at University of California, Los Angeles Zentmyer was a sportswriter for the Bruin. He went on to graduate work at University of California, Berkeley. Both Zentmyer's master's and doctoral theses discussed the cytospora attacking the Italian cypress.

Career
Zentmyer started work in 1937 at the San Francisco office of the United States Department of Agriculture's Department of Forest Pathology where he studied the spread of White Pine Blister Rust across the Pacific Northwest. In 1940 Zentmyer transferred to the Connecticut Agricultural Experiment Station where he worked on developing chelation and fungicidal chemotherapy to treat Dutch elm disease. The results of his experiments with hydroxyquinoline were published in Science in 1944. That same year Zentmyer was hired at the University of California Citrus Experiment Station to replace then-recently deceased William T. Horne. Zentmyer was one of the Station's first employees to specialize outside of citrus plants. He then began his career-long study of Phytophthora cinnamomi which had been ruining avocado crops across California at the time. After cinnamomi had been isolated in South Africa in 1942 Zentmyer was subsequently able to prove it was behind the plague harming avocado trees. Zentmyer began teaching plant physiology at University of California, Riverside. in 1962. In 1963 he and Donald C. Erwin were awarded a  grant by the National Science Foundation to study "Physiology, Nutrition, and Morphology of the Reproductive and Growth Processes of the Genus Phytophthora." Zentmyer was recognized by University of California, Riverside as faculty research lecturer for the 1963–1964 school year.

Zentmyer was awarded a Guggenheim fellowship in 1965, during which he studied a pandemic sweeping eucalyptus trees in the Jarrah Forest in western Australia. From 1974 to 1975 Zentmyer was the President of the Pacific Division of the American Association for the Advancement of Science.

Zentmyer was elected to the National Academy of Sciences in 1979. From 1972 to 1994 he was an associate editor of the Annual Review of Phytopathology. In 1981 Zentmyer retired from teaching and was awarded the American Phytopathological Society's Award of Distinction after having been a longtime member and officer. That same year the California Avocado Society gave Zentmyer a "special award of merit", only the third in their 65-year history, to recognize his work to save the avocado. In 1983 he was a resident at the Rockefeller Foundation's Bellagio Center.

In 2013 an eponymous cultivar of Persea americana Mill was patented. The "Zentmyer" rootstock was isolated in 1993 and underwent inoculation and testing for resistance to root rot.

Published works

Notes

References

Citations

Bibliography

Further reading

University of California, Los Angeles alumni
UC Berkeley College of Natural Resources alumni
University of California, Riverside faculty
1913 births
2003 deaths
People from North Platte, Nebraska
Plant physiologists
Burials at Olivewood Memorial Park